The Jaguaricatu River is a river of Paraná state in southern Brazil.

See also
List of rivers of Paraná

References
Road Map of Parana State

Rivers of Paraná (state)
Sengés